Geumnamno 5(o)-ga station is a station of Gwangju Metro Line 1 in Buk-dong, Buk District, Gwangju, South Korea.

Station Layout

External links

  Cyber station information from Gwangju Metropolitan Rapid Transit Corporation
  Cyber station information from Gwangju Metropolitan Rapid Transit Corporation

Gwangju Metro stations
Buk District, Gwangju
Railway stations opened in 2004